Foote Dam is a hydro-electric dam on the Au Sable River in Michigan.

Background
This hydro-electric dam was completed in 1918 and has a capacity of 9,000 kilowatts. It is located 9 miles upstream from Lake Huron and is named for William A. Foote, the founder of Consumers Power, which later became Consumers Energy. In 1896, Foote took a side trip from Kalamazoo to Allegan, where he conceived the idea of a hydroelectric plant along the Kalamazoo River. In Foote's mind, that plant and others would power the industrial centers throughout the state.

The dam is privately owned and operated by Consumers Energy.

References

Hydroelectric power plants in Michigan
Dams in Michigan
Buildings and structures in Iosco County, Michigan
Consumers Energy dams
Dams completed in 1918
Energy infrastructure completed in 1918
1918 establishments in Michigan